The Department of Health (DH) is a department of the Government of Victoria. It was formed from the splitting of Department of Health and Human Services into the DH and the Department of Families, Fairness and Housing, in response to the COVID-19 pandemic. The DH is focused on delivery of health and wellbeing services throughout Victoria.

The department commenced operations on 1 February 2021 with Euan Wallace, previously acting secretary of DHHS, as its inaugural secretary, and Martin Foley as the coordinating minister at the time.

Ministers 
, the department supports three ministers in the following portfolio areas:

References 

Victoria
Ministries established in 2021
2021 establishments in Australia
Government departments of Victoria (Australia)